Citybuses in Greater Bangkok are served by a state-owned citybus operator Bangkok Mass Transit Authority (BMTA) and private operators sub-contracted by either BMTA or Department of Land Transport. Since began operation, BMTA acted as the bangkok bus lines concessions owners. Private operators operated as a sub-contracted, They may run on the same routes as BMTA buses; Example: orange minibuses, cream-blue (or pink) 12 metre buses. These buses have the BMTA symbol on them, mostly seen below the driver's side window. These often follow slightly different route from the main big BMTA-bus or do not run along the whole route. However, these may cause a lot of problems such as reckless driving rushing between two buses from different lines that may serve on the same section of the road, subpar buses quality, and so on. Since 2017, Department of Land Transport introduced the bangkok citybus reform plan aiming to reduce overlapping, serve more area, and makes these lines more profitability. The newest reform plan published in 2019 stated that the bangkok bus lines concessions belongs to Department of Land Transportation, not BMTA anymore. And every single line can have only one operator.

This is a list of bus routes in Bangkok, operated by the Bangkok Mass Transit Authority or under private concession, currently operates in Bangkok and its exurbs: Nonthaburi, Pathum Thani, Samut Prakan, Samut Sakhon and Nakhon Pathom.

List of routes 
All routes operate in both directions unless detailed.

Airport Rapid
All These routes are routing through the expressway systems and go directly, or almost directly to the destination.

 Disabled Access Bus is Available on this route

1–99

 Disabled Access Bus is available on this route

100–199 

 Disabled Access Bus is available on this route

200-210, 501-558 

 Disabled Access Bus is available on this route

Reform Bus

 Disabled Access Bus is available on this route

Type 4 Bus

ETC 

 Disabled Access Bus is available on this route

 "ก" is the first letter in the Thai alphabet, corresponding to "A" in the English alphabet. The bus routes with ก (ko) are different from the original bus routes. The bus routes with ก (ko): 7ก 36ก 80ก 84ก 91ก 95ก 96ก and 168ก

References

External links

Bus transport in Bangkok
Bangkok bus routes
Bangkok
Bus routes